José María Núñez Piossek (born 6 December 1976, in Tucumán) is an Argentine rugby union footballer, currently playing for Scottish club Glasgow Warriors in the Celtic League.  He has also represented the Argentina national team, including being a part of their 2003 Rugby World Cup squad. His usual position is on the wing.

He made his international debut for Argentina in May 2001 in a match against Uruguay. He played one other match that year; coming off the bench in a match against the All Blacks. In 2002, he played in four Tests including games against Uruguay, Paraguay, Chile and Australia.

On 27 April 2003 Núñez Piossek scored 9 tries in a 144–0 victory over Paraguay.

He played a number of Tests during the early part of 2003, and was then included in the Pumas' 2003 Rugby World Cup squad. he played in games against Australia, Romania and Ireland. He played four Tests in 2004, and in two the following season. He played in the 2006 June Tests against Wales and the All Blacks.

Núñez Piossek is Argentina's all-time leading try scorer with 29 tries

Notes and references

External links
lequipe profile
Glasgow profile

1976 births
Sportspeople from San Miguel de Tucumán
Argentine rugby union players
Bristol Bears players
Living people
Rugby union wings
Argentina international rugby union players
Argentina international rugby sevens players
Glasgow Warriors players
Argentine people of Hungarian descent